Dominique Cormier (born October 11, 2003) is a Canadian ice hockey defenceman,  playing with the Princeton Tigers women's ice hockey team in the ECAC Hockey conference of the NCAA Division I.

Career 
Cormier began skating at the age of four, originally playing ringette before beginning hockey at the age of five. She played on the same teams as her older brother, occasionally serving on the same defensive pairing together, until the peewee AAA level. During high school, she attended Stanstead College, playing for the school's girls' hockey programme.

In December 2020, she announced that she had committed to attending Princeton University, joining their NCAA women's hockey programme beginning in 2021.

International career 
She was first selected for junior international duty at the age of 15, representing Canada at the U18 summer series against the United States in 2019. She narrowly missed the cut for the 2020 IIHF World Women's U18 Championship Canadian roster. She then became one of four returning players invited to the 2020 Team Canada U18 Summer Camp in preparation for the 2021 IIHF World Women's U18 Championship, before the championships were cancelled due to the COVID-19 pandemic.

Personal life 
Her brother, Lukas Cormier, was drafted 68th overall by the Vegas Golden Knights in the 2020 NHL Entry Draft.

References

External links
 

2003 births
Living people
Canadian women's ice hockey defencemen
Ice hockey people from New Brunswick
People from Kent County, New Brunswick
Princeton Tigers women's ice hockey players
Stanstead College alumni